Operation Falcon may refer to:
 Operation FALCON, a number of 2006 dragnet operations by the United States Marshals Service
 Operation Falcon, a 1984 sting operation against US falconers conducted by the US Fish and Wildlife Service 
 Operation Falcon, an Indian troop airlift operation along the Sino-Indian frontier in the Assam Himalayan region.